Carl Daniel Erskine (born December 13, 1926) is a former right-handed starting pitcher in Major League Baseball who played his entire career for the Brooklyn / Los Angeles Dodgers from 1948 through 1959. He was a pitching mainstay on Dodger teams which won five National League pennants, peaking with a  season in which he won 20 games and set a World Series record with 14 strikeouts in a single game. Erskine pitched two of the NL's seven no-hitters during the 1950s.  Following his baseball career, he was active as a business executive and an author.

Career

Erskine broke into the majors a year before Don Newcombe, and from 1948–50 was used primarily as a reliever, going 21-10. In 1951, he mixed 19 starts with 27 relief appearances, and went 16-12. Erskine was 14-6 in 1952 with a career-best 2.70 earned run average, then had his 20-win season in 1953, leading the league with a .769 winning percentage along with 187 strikeouts and 16 complete games, all career highs. This was followed by 18-15 in 1954, posting career highs in starts (37) and innings, then by 11-8 in 1955 and 13-11 in 1956.

When Newcombe was pitching in the ninth inning of the third game of the playoff with the New York Giants on October 3, 1951, Erskine and Ralph Branca were warming up in the bullpen. On the recommendation of pitching coach Clyde Sukeforth, who thought that Branca had better stuff, Newcombe was relieved by Branca, who then gave up the game-winning home run to Bobby Thomson. Whenever Erskine was asked what his best pitch was, he replied, "The curveball I bounced in the Polo Grounds bullpen in 1951."

Erskine, author of two no-hitters (against the Chicago Cubs on June 19, 1952 and the New York Giants on May 12, 1956), was a member of the beloved Dodgers team which won the 1955 World Series for the franchise's first Series title. Erskine's 14 strikeouts as the winner of Game 3 of the 1953 Fall Classic – including striking out the side in the ninth inning – broke the Series record of 13 held by Howard Ehmke (1929, Game 1), and stood for 10 years until Sandy Koufax struck out 15 New York Yankees in the first game of the 1963 World Series; but he was ineffective in Games 1 and 6, although he was not charged with the losses. From 1951 through 1956, Erskine won 92 games while losing only 58, which helped the Dodgers to four pennants during the "Boys of Summer" era. During his years in Brooklyn, he was affectionately known as "Oisk" by the fans with their Brooklyn accents.

In 1957, Erskine moved to Los Angeles with the team the following year, but lasted only a season and a half. He made his final appearance on June 14, 1959. In a twelve-season career, he posted a 122-78 (.610) record with 981 strikeouts and a 4.00 ERA in 1718.2 innings pitched.

Erskine thought movement, location, and change of speed were the keys to getting batters out.

Post-retirement
Following his retirement as a player, Erskine returned to his native Indiana. For the 1960
season, he worked as a color commentator for Saturday-afternoon telecasts of major league games on ABC, teaming with play-by-play announcer Jack Buck. He coached at Anderson College for 12 seasons, including four Hoosier Conference championships, and his 1965 squad went 20–5 and reached the NAIA World Series. He had 18 players named to All-Conference teams, and three named as All-American. In 1973, his final season, he coached John Bargfeldt, who later spent three seasons in the minors as a Chicago Cubs prospect. He also became a leader in the community, participating in numerous organizations and businesses, including rising to the presidency of the Star Bank of Anderson, Indiana, before easing back to the role of vice chairman of the board. He is devoted to his son Jimmy, who has Down syndrome and lives at home and holds a job nearby at the Hopewell Center for people with developmental difficulties.

To commemorate Erskine's accomplishments both as a Dodger and as a citizen, a  bronze statue was built in front of the Carl D. Erskine Rehabilitation and Sports Medicine Center. Erskine also donated part of his land to the Anderson Community School System to build a new school, which was named Erskine Elementary. Erskine serves as a member of the advisory board of the Baseball Assistance Team, a 501(c)(3) non-profit organization dedicated to helping former Major League, Minor League, and Negro league players through financial and medical difficulties. In 2002, Erskine Street in Brooklyn was created and named after him.

Erskine married Betty Palmer on October 5, 1947. They raised four children: Danny, Gary, and Susan, in addition to Jimmy.  His book, The Parallel (2012), likened Jimmy's struggles fitting into society with Jackie Robinson's breaking the color line. The Carl and Betty Erskine Society is a designation that raises money for the Special Olympics; Erskine has been involved in the Special Olympics for more than 40 years.

Books

 Roger Kahn, The Boys of Summer (New York:  Harper & Row, 1972)

See also
List of Major League Baseball no-hitters
List of Major League Baseball players who spent their entire career with one franchise

References

External links
 

 Carl Erskine Baseball Biography – Carl Erskine profile and career highlights
 Society for American Baseball Research. Carl Erskine, written by Bob Hurte.
Carl Erskine Oral History Interview - National Baseball Hall of Fame Digital Collection 

1926 births
Living people
American short story writers
Brooklyn Dodgers players
Los Angeles Dodgers players
National League All-Stars
Major League Baseball pitchers
Baseball players from Indiana
Sportspeople from Anderson, Indiana
Major League Baseball broadcasters
Anderson Ravens baseball coaches
Anderson University (Indiana) alumni 
Danville Dodgers players
Fort Worth Cats players
Montreal Royals players